Roger North, KC (3 September 16531 March 1734) was an English lawyer, biographer, and amateur musician.

Life

North was the sixth son of Dudley North, 4th Baron North and his wife Anne Montagu and was the brother of Francis North and Dudley North. He was born in Tostock, Suffolk. He attended Bury St Edmunds Grammar School and then Thetford Grammar School from 1663, followed by Jesus College, Cambridge and the Middle Temple. He was called to the bar in 1674, and was Steward of the Diocese of Canterbury in 1678. He became King's Counsel and a Bencher of Middle Temple in 1682.

North developed a good practice at the bar, helped by his elder brother Francis who became Lord Chancellor. Henry Hyde, 2nd Earl of Clarendon called him "one of only two honest lawyers I ever knew". During the Popish Plot, while Francis succumbed to the prevailing anti-Catholic hysteria, Roger remained detached and sceptical. Although he was always loyal to his brother's memory, Roger admitted that during the Plot  "wise men behaved like stark fools". In 1684 he became Solicitor-General to the Duke of York. After this his career suffered something of a check: Francis' unexpected early death in September 1685 was both a personal loss and a blow to Roger's career, since Francis was replaced as Lord Chancellor by the formidable Lord Jeffreys. Roger, who left a scarifying picture of Jeffreys in his memoirs, was a rather shy and diffident man, and frankly admitted to being terrified of Jeffreys; as a result, in his own words, his practice "declined so as to be scarce worth attending Court". The check was only temporary: in 1685, he was chosen as a Tory Member of Parliament for Dunwich, and became Recorder of Bristol. He was further advanced in 1686 to the office of Attorney General to Queen Mary of Modena. The Glorious Revolution stopped his advancement, and he retired to his estate of Rougham in Norfolk and increased his fortune by marrying the daughter of Sir Robert Gayer.

North died at Rougham on 1 March 1734, leaving a family from whom the Norths of Rougham were descended.

Works
North collected books, and was constantly occupied in writing, but he is best known for his Lives of the Norths, published after his death, together with his own autobiography (edition in Bohn's Standard Library, 1890, by Augustus Jessopp), an authority for the period. His comments on musical performance practice, in particular, have proven helpful for musicologists researching the Baroque style in England. In addition to his writing on performance practice, he wrote on musical aesthetics, pedagogy, and tuning and temperament; one of his most important achievements in this regard was devising a practical and detailed system for mean-tone tuning in the age before equal temperament. Another well-known work is Examen, a defence of Charles II's record as a ruler. He was also a learned connoisseur of architecture and designed a new gateway for the Middle Temple in London and a Palladian extension to his house at Rougham.

Family
North married Mary, the daughter of Sir Robert Gayer of Stoke Poges, Buckinghamshire and his first wife Mary Rich, daughter of Sir Thomas Rich, 1st Baronet, with whom he had two sons and five daughters. Notable descendants include Marianne North, the botanical illustrator, and Frederick North, a Liberal politician.

Quotations
To say truth, although it is not necessary for counsel to know what the history of a point is, but to know how it stands now resolved, yet it is a wonderful accomplishment, and, without it, a lawyer cannot be accounted learned in the law.

On the Popish Plot:

Wise men behaved like stark fools, and good and honest men like the veriest fourbs (fraudsters) that ever came out of Newgate. 

and-

People's passions would not allow them to attend to any reason or deliberation in the matter.. one might have denied Christ with more content than this Plot.

On Sir William Scroggs, Lord Chief Justice 1678–1681:

His course of life was scandalous and his discourse violent and intemperate. His talent was wit...he had a fluent expression and many good terms of thought and language, but he could not avoid extremities. If he did ill, it was extremely so, and if he did well, in extreme also.

On Lord Jeffreys, Lord Chancellor 1685–1688:

His friendship and conversation lay much among the good fellows and humourists, and his delights were accordingly drinking, laughing, singing, kissing and all the extravagances of the bottle...no friendship....could be so great in private which he would not use ill ....in public. No one that had any expectation from him was safe from his public contempt and derision."

On power:

The rising sun hath a charming effect, but not upon courtiers as upon larks: for it makes these (larks) sing and the others (courtiers) silent".

Notes

References

 Roger North's The Musicall Grammarian and Theory of Sounds: digests of the manuscripts, edited by M. Chan and J. C. Kassler, University of New South Wales, Kensington, 1988.
 Roger North’s the Musicall Grammarian: 1728, edited with introductions and notes by Mary Chan and Jamie C. Kassler, Cambridge University Press, Cambridge, 1990.
 J. C. Kassler, The Honourable Roger North, 1651–1734: On life, morality, law and tradition, Ashgate, Burlington, Vermont, 2009.

External links
 

1653 births
1734 deaths
English barristers
English King's Counsel
English MPs 1685–1687
Tory MPs (pre-1834)
Younger sons of barons
17th-century King's Counsel
English biographers
People educated at Thetford Grammar School
Roger
17th-century English musicians
17th-century English lawyers
18th-century English musicians
18th-century English lawyers
17th-century biographers
18th-century biographers
People from Breckland District
17th-century English writers
18th-century English writers